Nicole Müller (born 14 November 1994) was a German group rhythmic gymnast. She represented her nation at international competitions. 

She participated at the 2012 Summer Olympics in London. She also competed at world championships, including at the 2011  World Rhythmic Gymnastics Championships.

References

External links
http://www.bbc.co.uk/sport/olympics/2012/athletes/8cb4cecc-66e7-4f1a-870a-bda24cbb43d4
http://www.intlgymnast.com/index.php?option=com_content&view=article&id=3349%3Afig-releases-official-olympic-roster&catid=2%3Anews&Itemid=53
http://www.gymnasticsresults.com/olympics/2012/rg/participants.pdf

1994 births
Living people
German rhythmic gymnasts
Place of birth missing (living people)
Gymnasts at the 2012 Summer Olympics
Olympic gymnasts of Germany